Chittagong-13 is a constituency represented in the Jatiya Sangsad (National Parliament) of Bangladesh since 2014 by Saifuzzaman Chowdhury of the Awami League.

Boundaries 
The constituency encompasses Karnaphuli Thana, Anwara Upazila, and five union parishads of Patiya Upazila: Bara Uthan, Char Lakshya, Char Patharghata, Juldha, and Sikalbaha.

History 
The constituency was created for the first general elections in newly independent Bangladesh, held in 1973.

Ahead of the 2008 general election, the Election Commission redrew constituency boundaries to reflect population changes revealed by the 2001 Bangladesh census. The 2008 redistricting altered the boundaries of the constituency.

Ahead of the 2014 general election, the Election Commission renumbered the seat for Sandwip Upazila from Chittagong-16 to Chittagong-3, bumping up by one the suffix of the former constituency of that name and the higher numbered constituencies in the district. Thus Chittagong-13 covers the area previously covered by Chittagong-12. Previously Chittagong-13 encompassed Chandanaish Upazila and seven union parishads of Satkania Upazila: Bazalia, Dharmapur, Kaliais, Keochia, Khagaria, Puranagar, and Sadaha.

Members of Parliament

Elections

Elections in the 2010s

Elections in the 2000s

Elections in the 1990s 
Oli Ahmad stood for two seats in the June 1996 general election: Chittagong-13 and Chittagong-14. After winning both, he chose to represent Chittagong-14 and quit Chittagong-13, triggering a by-election in Chittagong-13. Mamtaz Begum of the BNP was elected in a September 1996 by-election.

References

External links
 

Parliamentary constituencies in Bangladesh
Chittagong District